Fantasy Patrol: The Chronicles is a Russian computer-animated web television series, and is a spin-off of the 2016 TV series, Fantasy Patrol. The series was created by Evgeniy Golovin and Dmitry Mednikov, and just like the original series, it is produced by Studio Parovoz. The first episode was previewed on the main stage of Mooltimir on June 1, 2019, and the series later premiered on Moolt on August 2, 2019. The first episode was then released to YouTube on August 27.

Plot

Each episode of Fantasy Patrol: The Chronicles goes into depth about the main characters of Fantasy Patrol; Helena, Valery, Mary, and Snowy, as well as many others. The stories told are in the style of motion comics, and are meant to explain the motives of their actions.

Cast

 Miroslava Karpovich (first season), Anfisa Wistingausen (second season) as Helena
 Polina Kutepova as Snowy
 Olga Kuzmina as Valery
 Yulia Alexandrova as Mary

Episodes

References

External links
 Fantasy Patrol: The Chronicles on Carousel

2010s Russian television series
2020s Russian television series
2019 Russian television series debuts
Russian children's animated adventure television series
Russian children's animated comedy television series
Russian children's animated fantasy television series
Computer-animated television series
Russian-language television shows